Joe Hicks is an American R&B and soul blues singer and songwriter. He hailed from San Francisco, California, United States, and found limited success in the late 1960s and early 1970s.  Hicks recorded an album for a subsidiary label of Stax Records.

Career
His 1968 recording, "Don't It Make You Feel Funky", was produced by Pat Vegas and released by AGC Records; it later appeared on the 1995 compilation album, A Treasure Chest of Northern Soul.  In 1969, he recorded the single, "I'm Goin' Home" b/w "Home Sweet Home - Part II", which was written and produced by Sly Stone, and released on the latter's Stone Flower label.

His joint compositions with Delaney Bramlett, "Sound of the City" and " I Know Something Good About You", were featured on Delaney & Bonnie & Friends' 1972 album, D&B Together. With Bobby Womack, Hicks co-wrote "Simple Man" and "Ruby Dean" (which both appeared on Womack's 1972 Understanding album), plus Womack's hit single, "That's The Way I Feel About Cha".

In 1973, Hicks recorded the album, Mighty Joe Hicks, which was released by Enterprise Records (a subsidiary label of Stax). It included the track, "Ruby Dean".

He is not to be confused with a similarly named, Missisissippi raised, Delta blues drummer and singer, who performed with the Fieldstones.

Discography

Albums

Singles

References

External links
Hicks songs and videos at NME.com

Year of birth missing (living people)
Living people
Soul-blues musicians
American rhythm and blues singers
American male singers
Songwriters from San Francisco
Singers from San Francisco
American male songwriters